Lycée Français Anne de Kiev (LFADK) is a French public co-educational international day school from  – 12 located in Kyiv, Ukraine. It is linked to the French Ministry of Foreign Affairs, is approved by the AEFE (Agency for French Teaching Abroad), and regulated by French authorities.

It was established in 1994 as the Petite école Anne de Kiev. In 2005 it was renamed to the Collége Anne de Kiev since it gained collége (junior high school) classes. In 2010 the name changed to its current one as it gained lycée (sixth form/senior high school) classes.

References

External links

  Lycée Français Anne de Kiev

Kyiv
International schools in Ukraine
1994 establishments in Ukraine
Educational institutions established in 1994
Schools in Kyiv